Krasno is a settlement in the Municipality of Brda in the Littoral region of Slovenia.

The local church is dedicated to Mary Magdalene and belongs to the Parish of Gradno.

References

External links

Krasno on Geopedia

Populated places in the Municipality of Brda